Thomas Michael Jeneary (born March 31, 1952) is an American politician in the state of Iowa. He was elected to the Iowa House of Representatives in 2018 and his term is set to end on January 8, 2023.

He was born in Des Moines, Iowa and is a retired dentist and funeral director. He is the Vice Chair of the Iowa Board of Dental Examiners.

References

1952 births
Republican Party members of the Iowa House of Representatives
American dentists
University of Iowa alumni
Living people
21st-century American politicians